Gateway to the Mysteries is the debut studio album of Eden, released in 1990 by Elysium Records.

Track listing

Personnel 
Adapted from the Gateway to the Mysteries liner notes.

Eden
Pieter Bourke – percussion, keyboards
Sean Bowley – vocals, guitar, keyboards
Ross Healy – bass guitar
Additional musicians
Paula Coster – additional vocals, whistle and psaltery (5, 8)
Andrew Skeoch – additional vocals (5)

Production and additional personnel
Don Bartley – mastering, engineering
Adam Calaitzis – engineering
Miles Van Dorssen – photography
Eden – production
Carl Rolfe – photography
Paul Rudwick  – design
Chris Thompson – engineering

Release history

References

External links 
 

1990 debut albums
Eden (Australian band) albums
Third Mind Records albums